The Society for Photographing Relics of Old London was founded in 1875 in London, England, initially with the purpose of recording the Oxford Arms, a traditional galleried public house on Warwick Lane that was to be demolished as part of the redevelopment of the Old Bailey.

Alfred & John Bool took the photographs, and when the project was announced in a letter to The Times, the news received such a positive response that the society's work was continued, with a total of twelve issues being produced over twelve years, containing a total of 120 photographs.

The photographs were commissioned to preserve an architectural record of buildings, some of which were built before the Great Fire of London in 1666, and which were scheduled for demolition as part of the city's urban redevelopment measures at the end of the 19th century. It was important to choose a photographic technique that would last for generations.

In 1870, the pigment printing process was invented. Society member Henry Dixon mastered the process, and the photographic images are still of excellent technical quality today. The group continued to document the old buildings of London threatened with demolition until its dissolution in 1886.

List of photograph
The 120 photographs published by the group over its lifetime were titled:
 Entrance of the 'Oxford Arms' Inn
 'Oxford Arms' Inn 
 Entrance of the 'Oxford Arms' Inn 
 Upper Gallery of the 'Oxford Arms' Inn 
 One of the staircases at the 'Oxford Arms' Inn 
 General view of the galleries at the 'Oxford Arms' Inn (originally issued 1875)
 Old houses in Wych Street 
 Old houses in Wych Street 
 Old houses in Drury Lane 
 Old houses in Drury Lane 
 Lincoln's Inn Gate House 
 Lincoln's Inn: Old Square (originally issued 1876)    
 Churchyard of St Bartholomew, Smithfield, London
 Churchyard of St Bartholomew, Smithfield 
 Green Churchyard, St Bartholomew, Smithfield 
 Window at the east end of St Bartholomew, Smithfield 
 North side and 'Poors Churchyard' at St Bartholomew, Smithfield 
 North side and 'Poors Churchyard' at St Bartholomew, Smithfield (originally issued 1877)
 Temple Bar 
 102 Leadenhall Street
 Old houses in Gray's Inn Road
 Shop in Brewer Street, Soho 
 The Sir Paul Pindar, Bishopsgate Street 
 Old house in Holborn / Staple Inn, Holborn front (originally issued 1878)
 Canonbury Tower 
 Canonbury Tower 
 Barnard's Inn 
 Barnard's Inn 
 Barnard's Inn 
 Old houses in Aldergate Street 
 Old houses in Aldergate Street 
 Shaftesbury House, Aldersgate Street 
 Christ's Hospital
 Christ's Hospital 
 Churchyard of St.Lawrence Pountney 
 Old houses in Great Queen Street (originally issued 1879)
 General view from Charterhouse Square 
 Charterhouse: Washhouse Court 
 Charterhouse: Washhouse Court 
 Charterhouse: The Cloisters 
 Charterhouse: The Great Hall 
 Charterhouse: The Great Hall 
 Charterhouse: The Great Hall 
 Charterhouse: The Great Hall 
 Charterhouse: The Grand Staircase 
 Charterhouse: The Governor's Room 
 Charterhouse: Entrance to the Chapel 
 Charterhouse: Founder's Tomb (originally issued 1880)
 King's Head Inn yard 
 King's Head Inn yard 
 White Hart Inn yard 
 White Hart Inn yard 
 George Inn yard 
 Queen's Head Inn yard 
 Queen's Head Inn yard 
 Old houses in Borough High Street, Southwark 
 St Mary Overy's Dock 
 Old houses in Bermondsey Street 
 Sion College, London Wall 
 Oxford Market  (originally issued 1881)
 Little Dean's Yard 
 Ashburnham House: Exterior 
 Ashburnham House: The Staircase 
 Ashburnham House: The Staircase 
 Ashburnham House: The Ante-room 
 Ashburnham House: The Dining Room 
 Ashburnham House: The Garden 
 Banqueting House, Whitehall
 The Water Gate of York House
 Lincoln's Inn Fields
 Lincoln's Inn Fields 
 Lincoln's Inn Fields (originally issued 1882)
 Lambeth Palace: The Gate House 
 Lambeth Palace: The Great Hall 
 Lambeth Palace: The Lollards' Tower 
 Old House, Palace Yard, Lambeth 
 Old houses, Aldgate 
 Old houses, Aldgate 
 'The Golden Axe', St Mary Axe 
 No.37 Cheapside 
 No.73 Cheapside 
 Old house, Great Ormond Street
 Old house, Queen Square, Bloomsbury 
 Shop, Macclesfield Street, Soho (originally issued 1883)
 Old houses, Fleet Street 
 The 'Old Bell', Holborn 
 The 'Old Bell', Holborn 
 St Giles, Cripplegate
 Old house, Fore Street 
 Old house, Great Winchester Street 
 Austin Friars 
 Staircase of Austin-Friars 
 Doorways, Laurence Pountney Hill 
 College Street 
 Innholders' Hall
 Doorway, College Hill (issued 1884)
 Inner Temple
 Inner Temple 
 Inner Temple
 Middle Temple
 Middle Temple
 Middle Temple
 Gray's Inn
 Gray's Inn
 Clement's Inn: Garden House
 Clifford's Inn
 Staple Inn Hall
 Six small subjects (originally issued 1885)
 St John's Gate, Clerkenwell
 Old houses in The Strand
 Great St Helen's, Bishopsgate Street
 Tennis Court, James Street, Haymarket
 Emanuel Hospital, Westminster
 Queen Anne's Gate
 Chimney-piece, Sessions House, Clerkenwell
 Chimney-piece, Court House, St Andrew's, Holborn
 Chimney-piece, Tallow Chandler's Hall
 Court room, New River Company
 Three doorways
 Five small subjects (missing) (issued 1886)

Gallery

References

External links
Archives at Bishopsgate Institute
Royal Academy collections: Society for Photographing Relics of Old London
Spitalfields Life: In Search of Relics of Old London

1875 establishments in England
1886 disestablishments in England
Organizations established in 1875
Organizations disestablished in 1886
English photography organisations
Photography organizations established in the 19th century
Cultural organisations based in London
Defunct clubs and societies of the United Kingdom
Defunct organisations based in London
History of London